The Dr. John Trierweiler House is a historic house in Yankton, South Dakota. It was built in 1926-27 for Dr. John Trierweiler. It was designed in the Georgian Revival architectural style by Kings & Dixon. It has been listed on the National Register of Historic Places since May 7, 1980.

It was designed by architects Kings & Dixon of Mitchell, South Dakota.

References

		
National Register of Historic Places in Yankton County, South Dakota
Georgian Revival architecture in South Dakota
Houses completed in 1926
1926 establishments in South Dakota